Tristaniopsis is a group of shrub and tree in the myrtle family Myrtaceae described as a genus in 1863. They have a wide distribution in Southeast Asia, New Guinea, New Caledonia and Australia.

Species

References

 
Myrtaceae genera
Taxa named by Jean Antoine Arthur Gris
Taxa named by Adolphe-Théodore Brongniart